Dorcacerus barbatus is a species of beetle in the family Cerambycidae, the only species in the genus Dorcacerus.

Description
In males antennae are longer than the body.

It feeds on Prosopis flexuosa (Leguminosae) and on the invasive weed Lantana camara (Verbenaceae) ad it is considered as a potential biocontrol agent.

Distribution
This species can be found in forests of Mexico, Belize, Guatemala, El Salvador, Honduras, Nicaragua, Costa Rica, Panama, Colombia, Ecuador, Peru, Brazil, Suriname, French Guiana, Guyana, Bolivia, Paraguay and Argentina.

References

Trachyderini
Monotypic Cerambycidae genera